Culex restuans is a species of mosquito known to occur in Canada, the United States, Mexico, Guatemala, and Honduras. It is a disease vector for St. Louis encephalitis and West Nile virus. In 2013 West Nile Virus positive specimens were collected in Southern California.

Entomophthoraceae family, fungus Species Erynia conica infects (and kills) mosquitos Aedes aegypti and Culex restuans. Attempts are being made to use it as a biological control for the insect.

References

restuans
Insects described in 1901